Pawan Kumar (born 20 September 1959) is an Indian former cricketer. He played two first-class matches for Hyderabad in 1984/85.

See also
 List of Hyderabad cricketers

References

External links
 

1959 births
Living people
Indian cricketers
Hyderabad cricketers
Cricketers from Hyderabad, India